Marco Neppe (born June 14, 1986) is a German former footballer.

References

External links

1986 births
Living people
Sportspeople from Offenbach am Main
German footballers
Eintracht Frankfurt II players
Wuppertaler SV players
SV Wehen Wiesbaden players
VfL Osnabrück players
Alemannia Aachen players
3. Liga players
Association football fullbacks
Footballers from Hesse